Macé is a French surname.

People with the surname include:
 Benjamin Macé (born 1989), French speed skater
 Charles J. V. Macé (1898–1919), French flying ace
 Gérard Macé (born 1946), French poet
 Jean Macé (1815–1894), French educator, journalist and politician
 Lilou Macé (born 1977), French-American video blogger

See also 
 Mace (surname)

French-language surnames